Aldridge-Brownhills may refer to:

Aldridge-Brownhills (UK Parliament constituency)
Aldridge-Brownhills Urban District